The Essential Collection is a compilation album for Motown soul singer Tammi Terrell, released by Universal Music Group's Spectrum Music in the United Kingdom in 2001. The compilation includes Terrell's only solo album, Irresistible in its entirety, several B-sides and unreleased tracks, and Terrell's most famous duet recording with singing partner Marvin Gaye, "Ain't No Mountain High Enough".

Track listing
"I Can't Believe You Love Me" (Harvey Fuqua, Johnny Bristol)
"That's What Boys Are Made For" (Fuqua, Gwen Gordy)
"Come On and See Me" (Fuqua, Bristol)
"What a Good Man He Is"  (Smokey Robinson, Al Cleveland)
"Tears at the End of a Love Affair" (Fuqua, Bristol, Sylvia Moy)
"This Old Heart of Mine (Is Weak for You)" (Holland–Dozier–Holland)
"He's the One I Love" (Robinson)
"Can't Stop Now (Love Is Calling)" (James Dean, Stanley McMullen, William Weatherspoon)
"Just Too Much to Hope For" (Fuqua, Bristol, Clyde Wilson, Wilbur Jackson)
"Hold Me Oh My Darling" (Fuqua)
"I Can't Go on Without You" (Fuqua, Bristol, Moy)
"Baby Don't You Worry" (Bristol, Jackey Beavers)
"There Are Things"  (Fuqua, Bristol)
"Two Can Have a Party" (Solo Version)   (Fuqua, Bristol, Thomas Kemp)
"Lone Lonely Town" (Jennie Lee Lambert, Mickey Gentile)
"Slow Down" (Jesse Bradman, Clarence Paul)
"I Gotta Find a Way to Get You Back" (Cornelius Grant, Eddie Kendricks, Edward Holland, Jr., Norman Whitfield)
"Ain't No Mountain High Enough" (with Marvin Gaye) (Nickolas Ashford, Valerie Simpson)

References

Tammi Terrell albums
2001 compilation albums
Albums produced by Johnny Bristol
Albums produced by Harvey Fuqua
albums produced by Smokey Robinson
albums produced by Clarence Paul
albums produced by Norman Whitfield
Tamla Records compilation albums